Němčice nad Hanou is a town in Prostějov District in the Olomouc Region of the Czech Republic. It has about 1,900 inhabitants.

History
The first written mention of Němčice nad Hanou is from 1406. Němčice nad Hanou gained the town status in 1970.

Notable people
Martin Ferdinand Quadal (1736–1811), Moravian-Austrian painter and engraver

References

External links

Cities and towns in the Czech Republic
Populated places in Prostějov District